Joan Smith is a writer and activist.

Joan Smith may also refer to:

Joan Smith (biathlete) (born 1967), American biathlete
Joan Smith (politician), Canadian politician
Joan Irvine Smith, philanthropist and environmental activist
Joan Merriam Smith (died 1965), aviator, winner of the Harmon Trophy

See also
Joan Spencer-Smith (1891–1965), deaconess and lecturer
Sheila Joan Smith, Professor of Immunology
Red Joan, a 2018 British Spy Thriller about a Soviet Spy named Joan Smith. 
List of people with surname Smith